Tiele may refer to:

Tiele people, an ancient people of Central Asia
Tiélé, Mali, a commune and village in Mali
Cornelis Tiele (1830–1902), Dutch theologian and scholar